Sunder Singh as some of his earlier movies he's screen name given Sundar Lall he was a noted Indian film actor between the 1930s and 1980s. He acted in many Hindi and Punjabi language films in his career as hero or supporting roles as a comedian.

Filmography 
He acted in more than 436 films. He has also sung some songs in Hindi film like 'Mastaana-1954', 'Lal quilla' and 'Upkaar', and in some Punjabi films. Some of his most noted films are:

Hindi 

  Imperial Mail (1938)
   Sipahi (1941)
 Dorangia Daku (1940)
 Khamoshi (1942)
   Shadi Ke Baad (1948)
 Albela (1951)
 Johari (1951)
 Dekh Kabira Roya (1957)
  Chandu (1958)
 Solva Saal (1958)
 Insan Jaag Utha (1959)
   Pilpili Saheb (1954)
   Shravan Kumar (1960) as Champak
   Khiladi (1961)
 Ayee Milan Ki Bela (1964)
   Accident (1965)
 Phool Aur Patthar (1966)
 Upkar (1967)
Badrinath Yatra (1967) as Gangu 
 Sadhu Aur Shaitaan (1968) as Pandit
 Padosan (1968) as Pandit
 Aabroo (1968) as Whisky Rani's (Tun Tun) husband
 Aya Sawan Jhoom Ke (1969) as Dr Yudhvir Singh
 Doli (1969)
 Anjaana (1969)
 Yakeen (1969)
 Bandhan (1969)
 Bachpan (1970)
 Aan Milo Sajna (1970) as Majnaram
 Johar Mehmood in Hong Kong (1971) as Pandit (Cameo Role)
 Mehboob Ki Mehndi (1971)
 Banphool (1971)... Panchilal
 Gaon Hamara Shaher Tumhara (1972) as Sunder, Paanwala
 Apna Desh (1972)
 Aan Baan (1972)
 Gora Aur Kala (1972) as Kotwal Sarju Singh
 Naya Din Nai Raat (1974) as Police Constable
 Pratigya (1975) as Barber Dinapur ResidentSunehra Sansar (1975) as BhanwarlalCharas (1976 film) as Police Constable PanduSaheb Bahadur (1977) as Hotel Manager Chacha Bhatija (1978) as Police Inspector
 Damaad(1978) as Dr Chatterjee
 Muqaddar Ka Sikander (1978) as Bus Conductor (Special Appearance)
 Aasha (1980 film) as Ramlagan , Dhaba OwnerNaseeb(1981) as Hotel Cook (Cameo Role)
 Biwi-O-Biwi (1981) as Girdhari
 Naram Garam (1981) 
 Dard Ka Rishta (1982) as Laundryman 
 Betaab (1983)
 Humse Naa Jeeta Koi (1983)
 Sharaabi (1984) as Mr Khaitaan,Cement King
 Arjun (1985) as Tea VendorMohabbat (1985 film)'' as Pandit
 Maa Kasam (1985) as Bhola Ram
 Aap Ke Saath (1986) as Pareshan Singh,Servant 
 Dacait  (1987) as Kashiram Kaka
 Bahurani (1989) as Driver Bihari Lal

Punjabi 

 Vilayati Babu (1981) as Lamberdar
 Chann Pardesi (1981) as Hawaldaar
 Choran Noo Mor (1980)
   Takkra (1976)
   Yamla Jatt (1976)
   Bhakti Me Shakti (1974)
 Dulla Bhatti (1966)
   Yamla Jatt (1964)
 Banto with Ashok Kumar,Pardeep Kumar,Nishi,Diljit,Majnu,Kartar Singh (1962)
 Jija Ji (1961)
 Chaudhary Karnail Singh as fattu  (1960)
 Do Lachhian (1960)
 Bhangra (1959) as Sunder
 Madari (1950)
 Lara Lappa (1953) 
 Jugni (1952)
 Chhai (1950) as Sunder

References

External links 
 
 Sunder Singh: Punjabi Filman da Sadabahar Mazahiya Adakar: Punjabi Tribune, Satrang, 30-JUNE-2018

1992 deaths
Male actors in Punjabi cinema
20th-century Indian male actors
Male actors in Hindi cinema
1908 births